Healy Lake is a lake located on Vancouver Island that is an expansion of South Englishman River.

Fishing

Natural populations of  Rainbow Trout are found in Healy Lake.

References

Alberni Valley
Lakes of Vancouver Island
Dunsmuir Land District